From June to September 1954, the Yangtze River Floods were a series of catastrophic floodings that occurred mostly in Hubei Province. Due to unusually high volume of precipitation as well as an extraordinarily long rainy season in the middle stretch of the Yangtze River late in the spring of 1954, the river started to rise above its usual level in around late June. The number of dead from this flood was estimated at around 33,000, including those who died of plague in the aftermath of the disaster.

Casualties

Partly as a result of this flood, the pressure to build new dams, the Gezhouba Dam and the Three Gorges Dam, in the upper reach of Yangtze river, gained considerable momentum.

Commemoration 
In 1969, a large stone monument was erected in the riverside park in Hankou (City of Wuhan, Hubei) honoring the heroic deeds in fighting the 1954 flood. Among the carvings on the monument is a calligraphic inscription by Mao Zedong, dedicated to the people of Wuhan:

Below, is his poem "Swimming" (1956), envisioning future bridge and dam construction on the Yangtze:

On the sides of the monument's pedestal are reliefs depicting heroic people of Wuhan fighting the flood, raising banners and placards with quotations from Mao Zedong.

Comparison
Compared to the 1998 Yangtze River Floods, this flooding was more severe in terms of total flow of water, but less in terms of the highest level that the flood water reached. This is probably a result of the intense logging on the banks of the upper reach of Yangtze River during the later part of the 20th century.

References

Yangtze River Floods, 1954
Yangtze River Floods, 1954
History of Hubei
Yangtze River floods
Yangtze River Floods, 1954